Cathy Connolly (born September 15, 1956) is an American professor and politician from Wyoming. A Democrat, she is a former member of the Wyoming House of Representatives representing the state's 13th district in Albany County. She is also a tenured professor at the University of Wyoming in Laramie.

Early life and education 
A native of Troy, New York, Connolly earned her B.S. from Buffalo State College. She then received three postgraduate degrees from the State University of New York at Buffalo: a Master of Arts (1989), a Juris Doctor (1991) and a PhD (1992). In 2009, Connolly completed Harvard University's John F. Kennedy School of Government program for Senior Executives in State and Local Government as a David Bohnett LGBTQ Victory Institute Leadership Fellow.

She moved to Laramie, Wyoming in 1992 when she accepted a faculty position at the University of Wyoming. Until 2000, she served as an adjunct professor in the Women's Studies Program in the College of Arts and Sciences. In 2000, she became director of the program, a post she held until 2006. Since 2006, she has been a professor, following six years as an associate professor in the sociology department.

A lesbian, she has a son, Lucas. She is the first ever openly gay member of the Wyoming State Legislature. She has authored a number of articles on sexuality including Out in the cowboy state: a look at lesbian and gay lives in Wyoming, published in the Journal of Gay and Lesbian Social Services in 2007. Connolly represents Laramie, the city in which Matthew Shepard was murdered in 1998 in what was believed to be an anti-gay hate crime. She is featured as a character in the play based on those events, The Laramie Project.

Political career 
The district Connolly represents is the 13th district (map), it falls entirely within the city of Laramie and contains a central portion of the city. Connolly was first elected to the legislature in 2008, winning the primary election unopposed. A Republican, Ember Oakley, filed to run against her in the general election but withdrew on August 29. She was therefore elected without opposition. She succeeded Democrat Jane Warren and took office in January 2009. In the 2009 legislature, she was appointed to the House Education Committee, to the House Travel, Recreation, Wildlife and Cultural Resources Committee and to the Select Committee on Legislative Facilities. She faced no opposition in 2010 and ran unopposed for re-election in 2012 and 2014.

Prior to becoming the representative from district 13, Connolly volunteered with the Wyoming Council for the Humanities. Connolly also served on the board of directors of Albany County SAFE Project and United Gays and Lesbians of Wyoming (now Wyoming Equality). She spent several years as a grant reviewer for the State Division of Victim Services and currently serves as a member of the State Department of Workforce Services' wage gap policy group. She is also a former chair of the parent board at Laramie's Whiting High School.

Electoral record

References

External links
Legislative homepage
Campaign website
Homepage at the University of Wyoming

1956 births
21st-century American politicians
21st-century American women politicians
21st-century American LGBT people
Democratic Party members of the Wyoming House of Representatives
Lesbian politicians
Lesbian academics
LGBT state legislators in Wyoming
Living people
Politicians from Troy, New York
Women state legislators in Wyoming
University at Buffalo alumni